The following lists events that happened during 2008 in the Republic of Cyprus.

Incumbents 
 President – Tassos Papadopoulos (until 28 February), Demetris Christofias (from 28 February)
 President of the Parliament: Dimitris Christofias (until 28 February), Marios Karoyian (from 28 February)

Events
Ongoing – Cyprus dispute

January 
 1 January – Cyprus adopts and the euro, along with Malta, becoming the 14th and 15th countries respectively to do so. The Cypriot pound notes and coins will remain valid in shops until the end of the month, and exchangeable at the central bank for some years.

February 
 17 February – Incumbent Cypriot President Tassos Papadopoulos is eliminated in the first round of the Cypriot presidential election. The election is later won on February 24 by Demetris Christofias after he defeated competitor Ioannis Kasoulidis.

March 
 March 5 – 12 – The 2008 Cyprus Cup took place; Canada women's national soccer team won the competition.

April 
 3 April – Greek and Turkish Cypriots open a crossing at Ledra Street, a main shopping street in Cyprus' divided capital Nicosia that had come to symbolize the island's ethnic partition.

May 
 24 May – The Eurovision Song Contest 2008 took place with Evdokia Kadi's Femme Fatale being chosen to represent Cyprus in the contest.

August 
 8 – 24 August – Cyprus competed in the 2008 Summer Olympics; the country won no medal.

See also
2007–08 Cypriot First Division
2007–08 Cypriot Second Division
2008–09 Cypriot Cup
2008–09 Cypriot First Division
2008–09 Cypriot Second Division
List of Cypriot football transfers summer 2008
List of Cypriot football transfers winter 2008–09

References

External links

 
Years of the 21st century in Cyprus
Cyprus
Cyprus
2000s in Cyprus
Cyprus